is a Japanese actress and pop star. She sang on the major J-pop hit "Dango 3 Kyodai".

Appearances
 You Gotta Quintet
 Cheap Love

External links

1971 births
Living people
Japanese actresses
People from Kumamoto